General Burr may refer to:

Edward Burr (1859–1952), U.S. Army brigadier general
George Washington Burr (1865–1923), U.S. Army major general
Rick Burr (born 1964), Australian Army lieutenant general